The Michigan Department of State is administered by the Secretary of State, who is elected on a partisan ballot for a term of four years in gubernatorial elections.

The Secretary of State is the third-highest official in the State of Michigan. As the name implies, the officeholder was originally responsible for much of state government, but now the duties are similar to those of the other 46 secretaries of states across the United States. If the Governor and Lieutenant Governor are both absent from the state, or the offices are concurrently vacant for some other reason, the secretary of state serves as acting governor.

In Michigan, the Secretary of State is not only responsible for elections, but also oversees vehicle registration and the licensing of automobile drivers, similar to a motor vehicles regulator in other states. The officeholder also oversees and regulates notaries public and is the keeper of the Great Seal of Michigan.

Under state law, the Secretary of State must have at least one office in each of Michigan's 83 counties.

The current Secretary of State is Jocelyn Benson, a Democrat.

Department organization

Customer Services Administration
The Customer Services Administration (CSA) is divided into the Bureau of Branch Office Services, the Driver and Vehicle Records Division, the Office of Customer Services, the Department of State Information Center, the Program Procedures Section, and the Program Support Section. The Bureau of Branch Office Services operates a network of branch offices providing driver's licensing, vehicle titling and registration, and voter registration services to the citizens of Michigan. The Driver and Vehicle Records Division manages driver and vehicle records maintenance activities. The Office of Customer Services oversees the Renewal-By-Mail and Internet Renewal, as well as the Uniform Commercial Code. The office serves International Registration Plan vehicle owners and Michigan residents who are out of state. The Department of State Information Center is the point of contact for many citizens seeking information about Secretary of State programs and services. The center also oversees driver and vehicle record sales and the distribution of the annual jury listing to Michigan counties.

Department Services Administration
The Department Services Administration (DSA) provides coordination and support to the agency in the areas of administration, finance, technology, project management, human resources, employee development, and occupancy management. The DSA includes the Office of Technology and Project Services, the Office of Human Resources, the Office of Occupancy Services, the Accounting Services Division, the Budget Services Division, and the department's Business Application Modernization initiative.

Legal and Regulatory Services Administration
The Legal and Regulatory Services Administration (LRSA) is divided into the Bureau of Information Security, the Bureau of Regulatory Services, and the Legal Policy and Procedures Section. The LRSA provides research and counsel to the Secretary of State on statutes and rules administered.

Election and officeholders

The Secretary of State is elected for a four-year term, concurrent with that of the governor. Candidates are nominated at partisan conventions. Under an amendment to the state Constitution which was passed in 1992, the Secretary of State is restricted to two four-year terms in that office.

The Secretary of State receives the courtesy title of The Honorable for life.

Source:
Michigan Manual 2003-2004, Chapter IV, Former Officials of Michigan

References

Motor vehicle registration agencies